The men's 1500 metres event  at the 1989 IAAF World Indoor Championships was held at the Budapest Sportcsarnok in Budapest on 4 and 5 March.

Medalists

Results

Heats
First 2 of each heat (Q) and next 4 fastest (q) qualified for the final.

Final

References

1500
1500 metres at the World Athletics Indoor Championships